Ulambayar Byambajav (24 November 1984 – 28 February 2020), known professionally as Byamba, was a Mongolian sumo wrestler and entertainer. He began his professional career in Japan in 2001 under the name ; tiring of the lifestyle, he retired from professional sumo wrestling in 2005. As an amateur, he won the Sumo World Championships twice in 2006 and 2007 and was a gold medalist at the 2009 World Games and 2013 World Combat Games. He also appeared in the comedy show Impractical Jokers. He died after a protracted illness in a Los Angeles hospital in February 2020.

Sumo career
He was born in Ulaanbaatar, and took up Mongolian wrestling at the age of 9, but he preferred playing basketball. He won junior titles in wrestling, judo and sambo. He was recruited as a professional sumo wrestler (rikishi) by former yokozuna Onokuni who was on a visit to Mongolia. He competed under the shikona of Daishōchi Kenta. He was a member of Shibatayama stable from July 2001 until September 2005, reaching a highest rank of makushita 15. However, tiring of the lifestyle, he quit at age 20 and as well as an amateur sumo career he also featured in film and television roles in Hollywood, and many commercials. He won the Sumo World Championships in 2006 and 2007. He won the US Sumo Open Championship held in California for eight consecutive years, from 2007 to 2014. His overall record at the US Sumo Open was 110 wins and 7 losses.

US film and television appearances
Upon retiring from professional sumo, Byambajav moved to Los Angeles. Having limited English, he initially worked in menial jobs and manual labour. However, he was able to gain a role as a sumo wrestler in the film Ocean's Thirteen (2007), through the Californian Sumo Association. In 2010, he spent 1 week in the house of Gran Hermano 12 (Big Brother Spain). In February 2013, he was featured on the American television show King of the Nerds. In April 2014, he appeared as the celebrity special guest on the CW comedy improv series Whose Line Is It Anyway?. In 2014 he was featured in One Direction's video for "Steal My Girl" alongside fellow sumo wrestler Yamamotoyama Ryūta. In May 2015, he appeared alongside Yamamotoyama in an episode of The Bachelorette.
 
Byamba appeared in the April 16, 2015, episode of the TruTV series Impractical Jokers, titled "Pseudo-Sumo". The loser, Joe, was told he was going to be in a baby commercial, and was then surprised by Byamba. Byamba appeared again on Impractical Jokers, on August 16, 2018, in an episode titled "Bull Shiatsu", in which Joe lost again. This time Joe was dressed inside a home-made massage chair, manually massages people at a mall. The punishment didn't end until he massages his former adversary, Byamba. In 2016, he appeared as a figure skating sumo wrestler in a television advertisement for GEICO. In 2017 he promoted a new variety of mandarin orange called the "Sumo Citrus" in Lindsay, California. He featured as a model for the Subaru car company.

Personal life and death
Byamba died in a Los Angeles hospital on February 28, 2020, after a protracted illness. He was married, with one child.

Professional sumo career record

See also
Glossary of sumo terms
List of non-Japanese sumo wrestlers
List of past sumo wrestlers

References

External links
Official website

1984 births
2020 deaths
Mongolian sumo wrestlers
Sportspeople from Ulaanbaatar